The Harvard College Debating Union (previously known as the Harvard Speech and Parliamentary Debate Society) is Harvard University's only internationally competitive debate team. As the winner of the most American Parliamentary Debate Association National Championships and the 2014, 2016 and 2018 champions of the World Universities Debating Championship, the team is consistently one of the most successful debate organizations in the world.

The HCDU is currently the top-ranked debate club in American parliamentary debate.

History 

Though formal debate at Harvard dates back over a century, the Harvard Speech and Parliamentary Debate Society was founded in the fall of 1981 in response to the recent creation of the American Parliamentary Debate Association.  The organization was created by leading members of the undergraduate Harvard Radcliffe Speech Team, Gordon Bell ’83 and Tony DiNovi ’84, and two graduate students who were veterans of parliamentary debate at Vassar and Yale, Tom Rozinski and Neil H. Buchanan. Members of the HCDU (then the HSPDS) began to compete in the American Parliamentary Debate Association, a national league of university debating societies that had been conceived only months earlier in late January or early February 1981.

The HCDU was a dominant force on APDA from the start, winning the national championships in 1983 and every third year after that up until 1992. To this day, Harvard holds the record for most national championships won by a school with eleven, including back to back titles in 2004 and 2005 and 2012 and 2013. The competitive strength of the HCDU was perhaps best demonstrated in the 1992–1993 season when Harvard teams won the national championships, world championships, and were twice runners-up at the North American championships in 1992 and 1993. This success was replicated over the course of the 2011–2012, 2012–2013, and 2013–2014 seasons, during which Harvard won two National Championships, two Team of the Year Awards, two Speaker of the Year Awards, one North American championship, and one world championship. 

Though the HCDU has been a student-run organization from its inception and faculty involvement has been kept to a minimum, the team has had several faculty sponsors.  These include Professor Richard Marius, a famous academic and writer, and the former director of the Expository Writing Program, as well as the Rev. Peter Gomes, Plummer Professor of Christian Morals and Pusey Minister in the Memorial Church. Today, the HCDU continues to be an entirely student-run enterprise, governed by an entirely undergraduate, seven-member executive board.

Recent awards 

 2015 APDA National Champions
 2016 WUDC Champions
2017 US Universities Debating Champions
 2018 US Universities Debating Champions
 2018 WUDC Champions
 2019 APDA Speaker of the Year
 2019 North American Championship Top Speaker
 2019 APDA Nationals Top Speaker
 2019 APDA National Champions
 2019 North American Universities Debating Champions
 2020 APDA Team of the Year
 2020 APDA Club of the Year

Structure 

The Harvard College Debating Union is run by a board of students who are elected by the team each winter and additional members appointed by that board. The executive board is responsible for all organizational decisions and planning, including running the Harvard Debating Championships, managing finances, coordinating travel to tournaments, training new debaters, recruiting members, and representing Harvard at all American Parliamentary Debate Association meetings. The executive board consists of seven members: the president, the vice president of American parliamentary, the vice president of British parliamentary, the vice president of finance, the vice president of membership, the vice president of public relations, and the vice president of equity.

National competition 

The Harvard College Debate Union competes mostly in the American Parliamentary style of debate as a member of the American Parliamentary Debate Association, an intercollegiate debate association with roughly fifty member universities across the United States. The HCDU competes at tournaments across the country that take place on Fridays and Saturdays on a weekly basis.  

The team is also active in the political structure of the league. The HCDU has been represented in all positions on the executive board of APDA: as president (1990–1991, 2012–2014, 2017–2018), vice president of operations (1997–1998, 2010–2011 and 2016–2017), vice president of finance (1995–1996, 2004–2005, and 2011–2013), member-at-large (1996–1997, 2008–2009, and 2011–2012, 2014–2015), and trustee (2008–2009 and 2009–2010).

International competition
The HCDU also competes internationally against organizations like the Oxford Union, Cambridge Union, and University of Sydney Union. The HCDU holds the most World Universities Debating Championship titles of any college in the United States, with wins in 1993, 2014, 2016, and 2018.

Every year, the HCDU attends the North American Debating Championships, the World Universities Debating Championships, and several inter-varsity tournaments at Oxford, Cambridge, and Yale. Harvard won the Cambridge IV in 2018 and reached the final round of both the Cambridge IV and the Oxford IV in 2019. Harvard has also won the Yale IV back to back for four years, starting in 2016. Harvard also won the North American Debating Championship in 2013 and 2014, the U.S. Universities Debating Championship in 2009, 2011, 2017, and 2018, and the North American Universities Debating Championship in 2019.

Campus events and tournaments

Harvard Debating Championships 

The inaugural Harvard Debating Championships were held on October 23–24, 1981. The tournament has been held annually each year since then and has not only remained an important annual event for the HCDU, serving as the primary fundraiser and for the team, but has become the largest collegiate debate tournament in North America. The team also runs the annual Harvard National Forensics Tournament, multiple round robins, and the Harvard College World Schools Debating Invitational.

Campus debates 
The HCDU has hosted several on-campus events, sometimes in conjunction with other student organizations at Harvard.  In the fall of 2009, one HCDU member debated PETA on the ethics of eating meat. A few years earlier, in 2005, HCDU sponsored a debate on Israel and Palestine between Alan Dershowitz and Noam Chomsky.

Triangulars
Harvard continues to debate Yale and Princeton in the annual tradition of the Triangular Debates. The competition began near the end of the 19th century as an ad hoc debate against Yale. A more formal association began in 1908, when Harvard, Yale, and Princeton began to hold annual debates called “Triangulars” to discuss current political and economic affairs. The debates gained national attention and were attended by high-level officials and large audiences. This tradition remains to this day, as the HCDU fields 2 three-member teams to debate against three-member teams from Yale and Princeton.

Community service
Harvard debaters organize and teach a modified form of parliamentary debate to middle school students as part of a Boston pilot program organized with a non-profit, Debate Mate.  In just one year, the HCDU began teaching in seven Boston schools, reaching roughly seventy students.  Volunteers met with students weekly and the program culminated in a tournament hosted on Harvard's campus.  The organization will be partnering officially with Boston Public Schools next year. The Harvard debaters also collaborate with the NAACP and Prison Debate programs for their demonstration debates.

Related
 Cambridge Union Society
 Oxford Union Society
 Studentafton
 The Durham Union Society
 London School of Economics, Grimshaw International Relations Club
 Yale Debate Association
 Berkeley Forum
 Olivaint Conférence
 Studentenforum im Tönissteiner Kreis
 Olivaint Conference of Belgium

References

External links
Official website

Harvard University
Student debating societies